Hans Aaron des Vignes (born May 25, 1985) is a television personality and radio broadcaster in Trinidad and Tobago.  He is heard from Monday to Friday from 6 a.m. to 9 a.m. and Sunday mornings from 9am-12pm on Boom Champions 94.1FM. He joined an aspiring DJs group known as the Militant Crew when he turned sixteen. As part of the group, he appeared on the long-time talent show Da Flava, a favourite among local youth. Two weeks later,  local media personality O’Brian Haynes asked him to do a radio show. Hans later found himself a job as one of the hosts on the entertainment series, EZone. He shared the spotlight with other well-known DJs and media personalities like Lisa Wickham, Jason Williams, Ancil “Blaze” Isaac and Tamara “The Empress” Williams. At EZone, des Vignes was also a production assistant and said the latter was his way to gain some experience in the field of production.

After a month at E-Zone he successfully landed a job hosting Party Flava talent face off where he first met soca star Umi Marcano who was at the time one of the competitors in the show. Hans later went on to manage Umi and from his hosting abilities was hired as a full-time presenter/producer of De Scene on Synergy TV and a radio presenter on 94.1 FM. He eventually left E-Zone and produced Synergy TV's soca star and Super Model. Hans partnered with one of his former managers to form Hand to Hand Productions.

As a host Hans can be now found hosting Rated C on CNMG and as a producer his work can be seen through the programmes "Second Stage", "Talkz" and "Bounce".

Personal life 
Hans is the son of renowned Tobagonian forensic pathologist, Dr. Hughvon des Vignes.

External links 
  www.synergytv.net
   www.boomchampionstt.com
  http://www.hansdesvignes.com

Trinidad and Tobago television personalities
Living people
1985 births